Vokopolë Castle is a castle in Berat, Albania. It is on a hill at 765 m over the sea level, northwest of Vokopolë, in the Ballolli region, close to the city of Berat. It is a monument of cultural heritage, recognized as such on 8 January 1977 in the Berat County, Albania.

References

Castles in Albania
Buildings and structures in Berat